Alexander Fergus (1899 – unknown) was a Scottish professional association footballer who played as a full back. His nickname, famously, was Fergie.

References

1899 births
Year of death unknown
Sportspeople from Kirkintilloch
Scottish footballers
Association football midfielders
Burnley F.C. players
Coventry City F.C. players
English Football League players